The Ramp Covered Bridge is a historic wooden covered bridge located at Hopewell Township in Cumberland County, Pennsylvania. It crosses the Conodoguinet Creek. It is one of 17 historic covered bridges in Adams, Cumberland, and Perry Counties.

It was listed on the National Register of Historic Places in 1980.

References 

Covered bridges on the National Register of Historic Places in Pennsylvania
Covered bridges in Cumberland County, Pennsylvania
Bridges completed in 1870
Wooden bridges in Pennsylvania
Bridges in Cumberland County, Pennsylvania
National Register of Historic Places in Cumberland County, Pennsylvania
Road bridges on the National Register of Historic Places in Pennsylvania
Burr Truss bridges in the United States